Brennan is an Irish surname which is an Anglicised form of two different Irish language surnames—Ó Braonáin and Ó Branáin. Historically, one source of the surname was the prominent clan Ua Braonáin (O'Brennan) of Uí Duach (Idough) in Osraige who were a junior Dál Birn sept stemming from a younger son of Cerball mac Dúnlainge (d.888).  Recent surname evaluations highlighted the geographic consistency of this lineage in the barony of Idough. However, based on the ultimate authority of Dubhaltach Mac Fhirbhisigh they are out of Ui Dhuinn (O’Dunn)  and, therefore, an Uí Failghi tribe, not Osraige. While it is clearly apparent that O’Hart’s pedigree is erroneous, it is suggested that Ó Cléirigh probably became confused while transcribing from Mac Fhirbhisigh. This is echoed by the modern scholar, Bart Jaski.

The Irish surname Ó Braonáin, means "descendant of Braonán". The personal name Braonán is derived from a word which means "moisture", "drop". The Irish surname Ó Branáin, means "descendant of Branán". The personal name Branán means "little raven". Brennan is also a given name.

Notable people with the surname include:

A
Aaron Brennan, fictional character from the Australian soap opera Neighbours
Ad Brennan (1887–1962), pitcher in Major League Baseball
Alastair Brennan (born 1945), British ice hockey player
Allison Brennan (born 1969), American writer of romantic thriller novels
Amanda Brennan, content and community associate at Tumblr
Andrew Brennan (disambiguation)
Angela Brennan (born 1960), Australian painter.
Anna Teresa Brennan (1879–1962), Australian lawyer
Anne M. Brennan, acting United States General Counsel of the Navy (2009–2010, 2017–present)
Archie Brennan (born 2000), English footballer
Archie Brennan (weaver) (1931–2019), Scottish tapestry maker
Arthur Brennan (1881–1931), Australian rules footballer
Ashleigh Brennan (born 1991), Australian gymnast

B
Barbara Brennan (born 1939), American author and spiritual healer
Barry Brennan (Galway footballer) (born 1956), Irish Gaelic footballer from County Galway
Barry Brennan (born 1975), Irish Gaelic footballer from County Laois
Bernie Brennan (born 1927), Canadian Football League player
Beth Brennan (also Willis), fictional character from the Australian soap opera Neighbours
Bishop Len Brennan, fictional character from Irish sitcom  Father Ted
Brent Brennan (born 1973), American college football head coach for San José State University
Brian Brennan (author) (born 1943), Irish-Canadian author and historian
Brian Brennan (born 1962), former professional American football player
Bríd Brennan (born 1953), North Irish actress
Bridin Brennan (born 1974), Irish pop singer
Biko Bradnock-Brennan (born 1992), Irish-English footballer

C
Cait Brennan (born 1969), American singer
Judith Tarr (pen name Caitlin Brennan) (born 1955), American fantasy and science fiction author
T. Casey Brennan (born 1948), American comic book writer
Cecily Brennan (born 1955), Irish artist
Charles Brennan (born 1967), Professor of Food Science at Lincoln University, New Zealand
Chris Brennan (born 1971), American mixed martial artist
Chrisann Brennan (born 1954), American painter and writer
Christine Brennan (born 1958), sports columnist for the USA Today
Christopher Brennan (sailor) (1832 – after 1863), Union Navy sailor in the American Civil War
Christopher Brennan (1870–1932), Australian poet and scholar
Ciarán Brennan (born 1954), Irish singer and musician
Cindy Brennan, co-owner and managing partner of Mr. B's Bistro
Claire Baker (née Brennan; born 1971), Scottish Labour Party politician
Colleen Brennan (born 1949), American pornographic actress
Colt Brennan (1983–2021), American football player
Conor Brennan (born 1994), Northern Irish footballer
Cormac Brennan (born 1995), Irish rugby union player

D
Dan Brennan (born 1962), Canadian NHL player
Daniel Brennan, Baron Brennan (born 1942), British Labour life peer and barrister
Darren Brennan (born 13 1996), Irish hurler 
Dean Brennan (born 1980), Irish footballer
Debbie Brennan, British Paralympian athlete
Denis Brennan (born 1945), Roman Catholic Bishop of Ferns
Don Brennan (disambiguation)
Donal Brennan (born 1986), Gaelic footballer
Doreen Brennan, Irish camogie player
Doug Brennan (1903–1972), Canadian professional hockey defenceman
Duncan Brannan (born 1970), voice actor sometimes credited as Duncan Brennan

E
Eddie Brennan (born 1978), Irish hurling manager, sports broadcaster and former player
Eddie Brennan (Gaelic footballer), Gaelic footballer
Edward A. Brennan (1934–2007), chairman of the board, president (1980–1995) and CEO (1984–1995), of Sears, Roebuck and Co.
Eileen Brennan (1932–2013), American actress
Ella Brennan (1925–2018), American restaurateur
Enya Brennan (born 1961), Irish singer

F
Fanny Brennan (1921–2001), French-American surrealist painter
Fran Brennan (born 1940), Irish soccer player
Frank Brennan (disambiguation)
Frederick Hazlitt Brennan (1901–1962), American screenwriter
Fredrick Brennan, American computer programmer

G
Garth Brennan (born 1972), Australian professional rugby league football coach
Gary Brennan, Manager of St. Patrick's G.A.A. Under 15's
Gavin Brennan (born 1988), Irish footballer
Geoffrey Brennan (born 1944), professor of philosophy
Georgianna Brennan, American journalist
Ger Brennan, Irish Gaelic footballer
Gerald Brennan (footballer) (born 1938), Australian rules footballer
Gerard Brennan (1928–2022), Justice and later Chief Justice of the High Court of Australia
Gloria Brennan (1948–1985), Aboriginal community leader and public servant from Western Australia
Gomeo Brennan (born 1939), Bahamian boxer of the 1950s, '60s and '70s

H
Harold Brennan (1905–1979), Australian politician
Howard Brennan (1919–1983), witness to the assassination of U.S. President John F. Kennedy

I
Ian Brennan (disambiguation)
Ivy Brennan, fictional character from the British soap opera Coronation Street

J
J. Keirn Brennan (1873–1948), American songwriter
Jack Brennan (disambiguation)
Jacob Brennan (born 1990), Australian rules footballer
James Brennan (disambiguation)
Jamie Brennan (born  1996/7), Irish Gaelic footballer
Jane Brennan, Irish actress
Jared Brennan (born 1984), Australian rules footballer
Jason Brennan (born 1979), American philosopher and political scientist
Jody Brennan (born 1983), Irish hurler
John Brennan (disambiguation)
Jon Brennan (born 1981), Jersey rugby player
Joseph Brennan (disambiguation)

K
Kathleen Brennan (born 1950), American musician
Katie Brennan (born 1992), Australian rules footballer
Keith Brennan (1915–1985), Australian diplomat
Kevin Brennan (disambiguation)
Killian Brennan (born 1984), Irish professional footballer
Kim Brennan (born 1985), Australian rower
Kip Brennan (born 1980), Canadian professional hockey enforcer
Kitty Brennan (born 1950), American jurist
Kate Lord-Brennan, member of the Legislative Council of the Isle of Man (from 2018)

L
Lee Brennan (born 1973), singer
Liam Brennan, president of the Royal College of Anaesthetists (from 2015)
Bishop Len Brennan, fictional character from the television series Father Ted
Len Brennan (1911–1943), Australian rugby league player
Les Brennan (born 1931), Australian rugby league footballer
Les Brennan (Australian rules footballer) (1910–1992)
Lesley Brennan, Scottish Labour Party politician
Louis Brennan (1852–1932), 19th century inventor
Luke Brennan (Australian footballer) (born 1985), Australian rules footballer
Luke Brennan (English footballer) (born 2001), English footballer

M
Mac Brennan (born 1990), American professional racing cyclist
Maeve Brennan (1917–1993), Irish short story writer and journalist
Margaret Brennan (disambiguation)
Marie Brennan, American fantasy author
Mark Brennan (disambiguation)
Martin Brennan (disambiguation)
Mary Brennan (born 1954), Member of the Florida House of Representatives
Matt Brennan (disambiguation)
Maureen Brennan (born 1954), English educator
Maurice Brennan (1913–1986), British aerospace engineer
Maurice B. Brennan (1842–1927), American politician
Max Brennan (disambiguation)
Megan Jane Brennan, Postmaster General of the United States (from 2015)
Michael Brennan (disambiguation)
Micky Brennan (born 1952), English professional footballer
Mitch Brennan (born 1954), Australian rugby league footballer
Moya Brennan (born 1952), singer and the sister of Enya
Murray Brennan (born 1940), New Zealand surgeon, oncologist, cancer researcher, and academic
Myles Brennan (born 1999), American football player

N
Nash Brennan, fictional character on the American drama One Life to Live
Natasha Brennan (born 1986), English rugby union player
Neal Brennan (born 1973), American writer, stand-up comedian, television director and producer
Nelly Brennan (1792–1859), Manx washerwoman
Nick Brennan,  British cartoonist
Nickey Brennan (born 1953), Irish hurler, manager and Gaelic games administrator
Nigel Brennan (born 1972), Australian photojournalist and author
Norman Brennan, serving police officer in London

O
Owen Brennan (footballer) (1877–1961), Australian rules footballer
Owen Brennan (restaurateur) (1910–1955), New Orleans restaurateur

P
Paddy Brennan (born May 1981), Irish jockey 
Patricia Brennan (1944–2011), Australian medical doctor
Patricia Flatley Brennan, director of the National Library of Medicine
Patrick Brennan (disambiguation)
Paudge Brennan (1922–1998), Irish Fianna Fáil politician
Paul Brennan (disambiguation)
Peter Brennan (disambiguation)
Philip Brennan (disambiguation)
Pól Brennan (born 1956), Irish singer, songwriter and producer

R
 Reed Brennan, fictional character from the book series Private
Richard Brennan (disambiguation)
Robert Brennan (disambiguation)
Ralph Brennan, New Orleans restaurateur and head of The Ralph Brennan Restaurant Group
Rory Brennan (born 1945), Irish poet
Rose Brennan (born 1931), Irish singer
Rosie Brennan (born 1988), American cross country skier
Rowan Brennan (born 1958), Papua New Guinean professional rugby league footballer

S
Samantha Brennan, British-born philosopher and scholar of women's studies 
Sarah Rees Brennan (born 1983), Irish writer
Scott Brennan (disambiguation)
Séamus Brennan (1948–2008), Fianna Fáil politician
Síle Ní Bhraonáin (born 1983), television presenter
Shane Brennan (born 1957), American and Australian television writer and producer
Shay Brennan (1937–2000), Irish footballer
Stella Brennan (born 1974), New Zealand artist, curator, and essayist 
Stephen Brennan (disambiguation)
Stuart Brennan (born 1982), British actor, writer, producer and director

T
T. Corey Brennan (born 1959), associate professor of Classics at Rutgers University
T. J. Brennan (born 1989), American professional ice hockey defenseman
Temperance "Bones" Brennan, fictional character from the television series Bones
Terrance Brennan, Chef-Proprietor of the restaurants of The Artisanal Group
Terry Brennan (1928–2021), American football player and coach
Terry Brennan (politician) (born 1942), Irish Fine Gael politician
Thomas Brennan (disambiguation)
Tim Brennan (born 1983), member of the Celtic punk group Dropkick Murphys
Timothy M. Brennan (born 1959), Compton police officer
Tony Brennan (1916–1965), Irish hurler
Tony Brennan (Gaelic footballer) (born 1944), Irish Gaelic footballer
Trevor Brennan (born 1973), Irish rugby union player
Tyler Brennan, fictional character from the Australian television soap opera Neighbours

U
Ursula Brennan (born 1952), British civil servant
Úna Brennan (1888–1958), Irish republican and feminist

V
Vincent M. Brennan (1890–1959), US Representative from Michigan

W
Walter Brennan (1894–1974), American actor
Will Brennan (born 1998), American baseball player
William Brennan (disambiguation)

See also
Brenan, given name and surname
Brennen, given name and surname

References

External links

1659 Ireland Census map of the name (O)Brennan
Griffith's Valuation map of the name (O)Brennan

English-language surnames
Irish families
Surnames of Irish origin
Anglicised Irish-language surnames